Cartoon Network is a European pay television channel broadcast in the Czech Republic, Hungary, Moldova, Romania and Slovakia. It launched on 1 October 2008 as a separate feed from the Polish feed, and is owned by Warner Bros. Discovery under its International division.

History 
Before the launch of the channel, Hungary, Romania and Moldova received the Polish feed of Cartoon Network on 30 September 2002, broadcasting in Polish, Hungarian, Romanian and English.

On 4 January 2008, the channel started broadcasting 24 hours a day in Romania. Initially only TV provider Dolce offered the 24h feed. A CEE feed specifically for Romania and Hungary was launched, replacing Cartoon Network Poland on 1 October 2008.

On 1 April 2015, the channel started broadcasting 24 hours a day in Hungary.

Czechia and Slovakia used to receive this feed in English. However, on 20 September 2017, a Czech audio track was added to the channel in the Czech Republic and Slovakia. That same year, on 20 October, Cartoon Network started broadcasting 24 hours a day.

On 26 February 2018, the channel launched a high-definition feed. Later, on 15 October, Cartoon Network changed its aspect ratio from 4:3 to 16:9.

Programming blocks
 Afternoon Fun on Cartoon Network
 Toony Tube
 Fun With HITLO

See also

Cartoon Network around the world
List of programs broadcast by Cartoon Network

References

External links
 Official Czech Site
 Official Hungarian Site
 Official Romanian Site

Children's television networks
Children's television channels in North Macedonia
Cartoon Network
Turner Broadcasting System Hungary
Turner Broadcasting System Romania
Television stations in Romania
Czech-language television stations
English-language television stations
Hungarian-language television stations
Romanian-language television stations
Television stations in the Czech Republic
Television channels in Hungary
Television channels in Moldova
Television channels in Slovakia
Television channels and stations established in 1998
2002 establishments in Hungary
2017 establishments in the Czech Republic
2017 establishments in Slovakia
1998 establishments in Romania
Warner Bros. Discovery EMEA